Ibrahim Aliyev (born 17 July 1999) is an Azerbaijani footballer who plays as a striker for Neftçi Baku in the Azerbaijan Premier League.

Club career
On 5 November 2016, Aliyev made his debut in the Azerbaijan Premier League for Neftçi Baku match against Keşla.

References

External links
 

1999 births
Living people
Association football forwards
Azerbaijani footballers
Azerbaijan youth international footballers
Azerbaijan under-21 international footballers
Azerbaijan Premier League players
Neftçi PFK players
Qarabağ FK players
Sumgayit FK players